The women's 5000 metres event at the 1999 Summer Universiade was held on 13 July at the Estadio Son Moix in Palma de Mallorca, Spain.

Results

References

Athletics at the 1999 Summer Universiade
1999 in women's athletics
1999